Royal Challengers Bangalore (RCB) is a franchise cricket team based in Bangalore, India, which plays in the Indian Premier League (IPL). They were one of the eight teams that competed in the 2014 Indian Premier League. They were captained by Virat Kohli. Royal Challengers Bangalore finished seventh in the IPL and did not qualify for the Champions League T20.

Squad
 Players with international caps before the 2014 IPL season are listed in bold.

Indian Premier League season

Standings
Royal Challengers Bangalore finished seventh in the league stage of IPL 2014.

Match log

References

2014 Indian Premier League
Royal Challengers Bangalore seasons
2010s in Bangalore